In mathematics and physics, k-vector may refer to:
 A wave vector k
 Crystal momentum
 A multivector of grade k, also called a k-vector, the dual of a differential k-form
 An element of a k-dimensional vector space, especially a four-vector used in relativity to mean a quantity related to four-dimensional spacetime